Salvatore Settis (born 11 June 1941) is an Italian archaeologist and art historian. From 1994 to 1999 he was director of the Getty Center for the History of Art and the Humanities in Los Angeles and from 1999 to 2010 of the Scuola Normale Superiore in Pisa.

Since 2010 he has been honorary president of the Associazione Culturale Silvia Dell'Orso. He is also a member of the Deutsches Archäologisches Institut, the American Academy of Arts and Sciences, the Accademia Nazionale dei Lincei, the Accademia delle Arti del Disegno, the Comitato scientifico of the European Research Council, and the American Philosophical Society.

Personal life and education 
Born in Rosarno, he graduated in classical archaeology from the University of Pisa as a student of the Scuola Normale Superiore of Pisa  in 1963. He married Chiara Frugoni in 1965, with whom he had three children.

Career

Getty Center 
Settis, who was known as a scholar of ancient and Renaissance art, was a Getty consultant and scholar before joining the staff of the Getty Center in Los Angeles, California in 1994. He was appointed director in March 1993, to replace the founder Kurt Forster, who resigned in 1992 .  Settis left that position in January 1999, announcing that he would return to his former position as a professor of classical archaeology at the Scuola Normale Superiore.

Honors
2001 A. W. Mellon Lectures in the Fine Arts

Works 
 La "Tempesta" interpretata. Giorgione, i committenti, il soggetto, Torino, Einaudi, 1978
 Settis-La Regina-Agosti-Farinella, La Colonna Traiana, Collana Saggi n.716, Torino, Einaudi 1988
 Laocoonte. Fama e stile, Collana Virgolette, Roma, Donzelli 1999, .
 Italia S.p.A. L'assalto al patrimonio culturale, Collana Gli struzzi n.554, Torino, Einaudi 2002
 Passaggi e paesaggi (with Saverio Calocero), Roma, Donzelli 2003
 Quale eccellenza? Intervista sulla Normale di Pisa (edited by Silvia Dell'Orso), Collana Saggi Tascabili, Roma-Bari, Laterza, 2004, .
 
 Battaglie senza eroi. I beni culturali tra istituzioni e profitto, Electa, Milano 2005
 (editor) Memoria dell'antico nell'arte italiana, Einaudi, Torino
 Iconografia dell'arte italiana 1100-1500: una linea, Collana Piccola Biblioteca, Torino, Einaudi, 2005
 
 La villa di Livia. Le pareti ingannevoli, Mondadori Electa, Milano 2008
 Artisti e committenti fra Quattro e Cinquecento, Postfazione di Antonio Pinelli, Collana Piccola Biblioteca, Torino, Einaudi, 2010
 Paesaggio Costituzione cemento. La battaglia per l'ambiente contro il degrado civile, Torino, Einaudi, 2010
 Azione Popolare. Cittadini per il bene comune, Torino, Einaudi, 2012
 
 (presentazione di) Il cammino della Comunità, Roma, Edizioni di Comunità, 2013
 Se Venezia muore, Collana Vele, Torino, Einaudi, 2014, .
 Costituzione! Perché attuarla è meglio che cambiarla, Torino, Einaudi, 2016, .
 Architettura e democrazia. Paesaggio, città, diritti civili, Torino, Einaudi, 2017
 Cieli d'Europa. Cultura, creatività, uguaglianza, UTET, 2017

As editor 
 
 Civiltà dei Romani, Electa, Milano, 1990-1993
 I Greci. Storia, cultura, arte, società, Torino, Einaudi 1996-2002

References

External links 
 
 Intervento on Riforma Gelmini
 Interview on Annozero - 16 April 2009

Academic staff of the University of Pisa
Italian archaeologists
Italian art historians
1941 births
Grand Officers of the Order of Merit of the Italian Republic
People from Calabria
Viareggio Prize winners
Chevaliers of the Légion d'honneur
Academic staff of the Scuola Normale Superiore di Pisa
Living people